Daniel Alba (8 November 1940 – 21 January 2012) was a Mexican wrestler. He competed at the 1968 Summer Olympics.

References

1940 births
2012 deaths
Olympic wrestlers of Mexico
Wrestlers at the 1968 Summer Olympics
Mexican male sport wrestlers
Sportspeople from Chihuahua (state)